The Strokes are an American rock band formed in New York City in 1998. The band is composed of lead singer and songwriter Julian Casablancas, guitarists Nick Valensi and Albert Hammond Jr., bassist Nikolai Fraiture, and drummer Fabrizio Moretti. They were a leading group of the early-2000s indie rock revival.

The release of their EP The Modern Age in early 2001 sparked a bidding war among major labels, with the band eventually signing to RCA Records. That summer, they released their debut album, Is This It, to critical acclaim and strong sales. It has since appeared on numerous "best album" lists. It was followed by Room on Fire (2003) and First Impressions of Earth (2005), both of which sold well but failed to match Is This It in critical success.

Following a five-year hiatus, they released Angles (2011) to a generally positive reception, and Comedown Machine (2013) to lukewarm critical reception, both with dwindling sales. Following the end of their initial contract with RCA, they released the Future Present Past EP (2016) through Casablancas' label Cult. The band were relatively inactive throughout the decade, making infrequent live appearances and directing most media attention to individual projects.

In 2020, they released their first studio album in seven years, The New Abnormal, produced by Rick Rubin and released through Cult and RCA. The album received highly positive reviews and critics considered it a return to form. It went on to win Best Rock Album at the 63rd Annual Grammy Awards.

History

Formation and The Modern Age EP (1998–2001)

Lead singer-songwriter Julian Casablancas, guitarist Nick Valensi, and drummer Fabrizio Moretti started playing together as teenagers while attending Dwight School in Manhattan, and formed an informal band in 1997. They later added bassist Nikolai Fraiture to their ranks, a close childhood friend of Casablancas who had attended the Lycée Français de New York with him. At the end of 1998, the group invited guitarist Albert Hammond, Jr. to play with them. He had just moved to New York City and reconnected with Casablancas, whom he knew from their brief stints at the private boarding school Institut Le Rosey, near Nyon, Switzerland. The two soon became roommates.

In the following two years, the band practiced and performed tirelessly in New York City. Many of their contemporaries have credited the band's earliest successes to their dedication and hustle, as well as their engaging personalities. They practiced most nights, with many rehearsals taking place in The Music Building in Midtown Manhattan. They played their first show as The Strokes on September 14, 1999, at The Spiral. They soon frequented Manhattan's rock clubs including HiFi Bar and the Luna Lounge on the Lower East Side of New York, and later Manhattan's popular Mercury Lounge. Mercury Lounge's young booker Ryan Gentles eventually quit his job to become the band's manager.

The band began rehearsing a fourteen-song set (an early blueprint of the Strokes' 2001 debut, Is This It)—including, "Alone, Together", "Barely Legal", "Last Nite", "The Modern Age", "New York City Cops", "Soma", "Someday," "Take It or Leave It", and "This Life" (an early version of "Trying Your Luck"). Most of these songs now feature different lyrics. The band connected with producer Gordon Raphael in 2000 following a show at Luna Lounge and made a demo, The Modern Age EP, with him. The band sent the demo to the newly reformed Rough Trade Records in the UK, sparking interest there, and leading to their first release (via the website of the UK magazine, NME, who gave away a free MP3 download of "Last Nite" a week prior to the physical release as part of The Modern Age EP in 2001). The EP sparked a bidding war among record labels, the largest for a rock band in years. In August 2001, the Strokes made their first appearance on the cover of the publication The Fader in its ninth issue.

Is This It  (2001–2002) 

The Strokes released their debut album, Is This It, in the US in October 2001. The album was produced by Gordon Raphael, as was their follow-up album Room On Fire. RCA Records delayed the North American (US) release over concerns with the album's cover and lyrics. The UK-released cover features a black-and-white photo of a gloved hand on a woman's naked backside, shown in semi-profile (photographer Colin Lane's then-girlfriend) while the North American version replaced it with a photo of particle collisions in the Big European Bubble Chamber. RCA replaced the track "New York City Cops" with "When It Started", as the former featured potentially inflammatory lyrics in the wake of the September 11 attacks. The track "New York City Cops"—featuring the refrain, "New York City Cops, they ain't too smart"—was listed as No. 12 on New York magazine's "Ultimate New York Playlist" on March 1, 2010. Despite its delayed release (and the potential controversy), Is This It received critical acclaim—among other accolades, four stars from Rolling Stone, and a 9.1 from Pitchfork Media. The album made many critics' top-ten lists, was named the best album of the year by Entertainment Weekly and Time, and (in an article previewing summer concerts) NME urged readers to attend the Strokes' shows—as they were touring some of the "best pop songs ever". While critics noted the influence of CBGB stalwarts Television, Casablancas and bandmates said they had never heard the band, instead citing the Velvet Underground as a reference point.

After the release of Is This It, the band toured around the world—including Japan, Australia, New Zealand, Europe, and North America (the band opened for the Rolling Stones on numerous occasions during the North American leg of their tour). The self-made mini-documentary "In Transit" was filmed during the summer tour of Europe. In August 2002, the band headlined the UK's Carling Weekend festivals for the second time, subsequently playing at New York's Radio City Music Hall on a bill with the White Stripes. Jack White joined the Strokes on stage to perform the guitar solo on "New York City Cops". During that period, the band also appeared as musical guests on numerous late-night talk shows. Is This It yielded several singles and music videos, all of which were directed by Roman Coppola.

Is This It has had an enduring impact on fans and critics alike. In 2009, NME named Is This It as the Greatest Album of the Decade (2000s). The album placed second on a similar list compiled by Rolling Stone (the same issue featured a list of the '100 Best Songs of the 00s', featuring "Hard to Explain" and "Last Nite"  at Nos. 59 and 16, respectively). In January 2011, Rolling Stone conducted a survey among their Facebook fans to determine the top ten debut albums of all time. Is This It came in at number ten and was also the most recent behind Pearl Jam's 1991 debut.

Room on Fire (2003–2004)

The group began recording their follow-up in 2002 with producer Nigel Godrich (best known for his work with Radiohead), but later split with him in favor of Gordon Raphael, the producer of Is This It. Recordings with Godrich were never revealed. In August 2003, the band toured Japan, playing a couple of the upcoming songs: "Reptilia", "Meet Me in the Bathroom", "The Way It Is", "Between Love & Hate" (formerly known as "Ze Newie") and "12:51" (formerly known as "Supernova"). The band also played Paul Anka's "My Way" with Japanese lyrics. The Strokes released their second album Room on Fire in October 2003. It received praise from critics but was less commercially successful, although it still went gold. The album's sound maintained the Strokes' familiar reference points, while also evoking groups such as the Cars, Bob Marley, and Blondie. In the process, they made the cover of Spin Magazine for the second time, with each member receiving his own cover. They also made the cover of Rolling Stone for the first time. Additional media coverage of the band came from the relationship between Moretti and actress Drew Barrymore, which ended in January 2007. The first single taken from Room on Fire was the song "12:51", which used distinct keyboard-like sounds produced by Valensi's guitar. The video was also directed by Roman Coppola, and was inspired by the futuristic look of the 1980s film Tron. This consisted of a mainly black scene, with instances of glowing picton blue and riptide.

In November 2003, the Strokes played on Late Night with Conan O'Brien, performing "Reptilia", "What Ever Happened", "Under Control" and "I Can't Win". During the 2003-2004 "Room on Fire Tour", the band were supported by Kings of Leon and Regina Spektor. While on tour, Spektor and the Strokes recorded the song "Modern Girls & Old Fashion Men", released as a B-side on the "Reptilia" single. Also during the tour, the band included the Clash's "Clampdown" as a cover, which was released as the B-side for "The End Has No End".

In late 2004, the Strokes revealed plans to release a live album. The Live in London LP was planned for release in October 2004, but was abandoned, reportedly due to recording quality problems. The chosen gig was one held at the legendary Alexandra Palace in North London.

First Impressions of Earth and hiatus (2005–2007) 

In late September 2005, "Juicebox", the first single from the Strokes' then unreleased third album, was leaked online, forcing the single's release date to be advanced. The single was then released as an exclusive on online download services. "Juicebox" became the Strokes' second UK Top 10 hit, as well as their second US Modern Rock Top 10 success. During November and December 2005 the Strokes did a promotional tour for the still unreleased album, which involved doing one-off shows in major cities around the world. Their third album, First Impressions of Earth, was released on December 30, 2005, in Germany and January 3, 2006, elsewhere. It received mixed reviews and debuted at number four in the U.S. and number one in the UK, the latter being a first for the band. In Japan, it went gold within the first week of release. It was also the most downloaded album for two weeks on iTunes. Fraiture claimed that the album was "like a scientific breakthrough". In January 2006, the band then made their second appearance on Saturday Night Live playing "Juicebox" and "You Only Live Once". The album was somewhat a departure from the band's two previous albums. One reason for this was a switch of producers from Gordon Raphael to David Kahne. Despite its initial strong sales, First Impressions of Earth received the worst reception, both commercially and critically, of all their albums.

In 2006, the band played 18 sold-out shows during their UK tour. In February 2006, the Strokes won "Best International Band" at the NME Awards. In March, the band returned to the U.S. with their longest tour yet. The second single off First Impressions of Earth, "Heart in a Cage", was released in March 2006. During the summer of 2006, the Strokes played several festival dates in Europe, including the Hultsfred Festival in Sweden, Roskilde Festival in Denmark, the Oxegen Festival in Ireland, the Montreux Jazz Festival in Switzerland, the FIB (Festival Internacional de Benicàssim), Fuji Rock Festival and headlined the Pentaport Rock Festival in South Korea. They then toured Australia and Mexico in late August and early September, followed by the second leg of the United States tour. While in the U.S., the Strokes opened for Tom Petty & the Heartbreakers for five shows during their Highway Companion tour. The Strokes went on to complete another US tour. During this final tour Casablancas stated to fans that the band would be taking an extensive break after it finished. An e-mail was sent out soon afterwards by Strokes manager Ryan Gentles, confirming that "much needed break". A new band website went online in May 2007 along with the release of an alternate video to their single "You Only Live Once" directed by Warren Fu. The video also featured a brief interlude with "Ize of the World", also from First Impressions of Earth. The song "You Talk Way Too Much" was used in a commercial for the Ford Sync. Aleksandra Cisneros became the Strokes' assistant manager in late 2007.

Angles (2009–2011)

The Strokes frontman Julian Casablancas and guitarist Nick Valensi started writing material for the album in January 2009, intent on entering the studio that February. Julian commented in Rolling Stone that they had completed about three songs that sounded like a mixture of 1970s rock and "music from the future". On March 31, 2009, from their MySpace account, the band announced the end of their "much needed hibernation period" and the commencement of new writing and rehearsing for a fourth full-length album, entitled Angles. This album would be different from the first three in that it would feature music written by the other four Strokes, rather than Casablancas writing ninety-five percent of the material again: "It's supercollaborative, and it sounds different," said Valensi, "but it has a Strokes vibe to it." In an NME article, Pharrell Williams expressed interest in producing this upcoming album. This followed the news that Casablancas had collaborated with Williams and Santigold on "My Drive Thru", a track commemorating the 100th anniversary of Converse's Chuck Taylor All-Stars shoe. The song was available as a free download from the official Converse site. The album was due to be released in late 2009, but disagreements about the songs' readiness forced the Strokes to scale back this date. On February 1, 2010, the Strokes announced on their website that the recording of the fourth album was being helmed by award-winning producer Joe Chiccarelli. According to Chiccarelli in an interview with HitQuarters, the two camps first met in 2009 and, after finding they shared a similar mind space and similar thoughts on the potential direction of the new record, tried out some tracking. Not long after recording began, however, the band became frustrated with Chiccarelli's reserved production style.  Only one song from these recording sessions, "Life Is Simple in the Moonlight", remained on the album's track listing.  Inspired, in part, by bands like MGMT, Arctic Monkeys, and Crystal Castles, the Strokes decided to experiment with various production techniques, and recorded the rest of the album's material at Albert Hammond, Jr.'s home studio in upstate New York with award-winning engineer Gus Oberg.

The Strokes confirmed that they would be headlining the Isle of Wight Festival, Lollapalooza, Roskilde Festival, Hurricane Festival, Splendour in the Grass, Rockness, Outside Lands Music and Arts Festival, On The Bright Side, and Austin City Limits Music Festival in 2010.  Additionally, the Strokes were announced as the 2011 headliner for the Coachella Valley Music and Arts Festival and the New Orleans Jazz & Heritage Festival in May, Festival Internacional de Benicàssim, Oxegen, Paléo, Peace & Love and Super Bock Super Rock in July, and Reading Festival and Summer Sonic in August. They were also sub-headliners to Pulp at Leeds Festival during the bank holiday weekend in August. On June 9, 2010, at Dingwalls London, England, the band played a secret show under the name 'Venison' to a crowd of just 487. This was their first live gig since October 2006. The band did not play any new material.

The lead single from the new album, "Under Cover of Darkness", was released on February 9, 2011. The 7" was officially released on March 1, 2011, and contained another track from Angles, "You're So Right", as the B-side, followed by the album on March 18, 2011.
"Taken for a Fool" was confirmed as the second single, which was sent to U.S. radio on May 24, 2011. On June 9, the Strokes announced that a music video for "Taken For a Fool" was in the works, and that it is directed by Laurent Briet. They revealed that the music video should be finished by the end of the month. The Strokes put out the music video for "Taken For a Fool" on July 8, 2011. In mid-March 2011, an interview with ShortList magazine revealed that the Strokes had already begun working on their fifth studio album. However, sessions were delayed due to the mixing process of Angles. Julian Casablancas and Nick Valensi both confirmed that there was material in the works as well as plenty of leftover material. Frontman Julian Casablancas claimed that the band was eager to begin working on new material and were already supposed to, but it took longer than expected to master Angles.

Comedown Machine (2012−2015)

In April 2012, bassist Nikolai Fraiture posted a tweet announcing that the band was heading into the studio to work on some new ideas. The Strokes later revealed that they were planning to record a new album as soon as possible. Fraiture added that the band would record their fifth album in the same manner as they put together Angles, with each member bringing in his own ideas and putting them together in the studio. On January 17, 2013, Seattle alternative radio station 107.7 The End posted on their Facebook page that they were previewing a new song by the Strokes entitled "All the Time". It was later confirmed that "All the Time" would be the lead single from the untitled fifth album. On January 25, 2013, the song "One Way Trigger" was published on their official website, and made available for free download. The song was initially met with a mixed reaction from fans of the band. On January 28, a Reddit user discovered what he correctly assumed to be the new album cover within the subpages of the band's official website, which led to a widespread rumor that the new album would be titled Comedown Machine. On January 30, the title for the fifth album was revealed to be Comedown Machine, set to be released on March 26 in the U.S. and March 25 in the UK. On February 13, 2013, the first single from the band's fifth album premiered on the radio, named "All the Time". The single was released for download on February 19, and was described as a return to the classic Strokes sound of first albums Is This It and Room on Fire. The album was released on March 25, 2013, in the UK and March 26 in the United States. The band decided to pull a media blackout with the album: no promotion in the form of TV appearances, interviews, photos, shows, or tours. On October 15, 2013, the band revealed that they were looking to "return to the scene" in 2014.

In May 2014, the Strokes performed their first U.S. show in three years at the Capitol Theatre in Port Chester, New York, performing songs from Comedown Machine for the first time. The band played at three other shows in 2014, including two headlining slots at Governors Ball Music Festival in New York City and FYF Fest in Los Angeles. On November 12, 2014, it was announced the band would headline Primavera Sound in 2015 for the festival's 15th anniversary. On March 2, 2015, the band announced their second 2015 European festival headline appearance would be at London's annual British Summer Time: Hyde Park festival on June 18, 2015, the band's first London show in five years. The announcement takes the band's number of appearances slated for 2015 up to six, with them also playing Big Guava Music Festival in Tampa, Florida, Shaky Knees Festival in Atlanta, Georgia, Landmark Festival in Washington, D.C., and Austin City Limits in Austin, Texas, as well as the previously announced Primavera Sound 15th Anniversary. During their performance at Landmark Music Festival lead singer Julian Casablancas stated that the band was back in the studio working on a follow up to their 2013 album Comedown Machine. In late 2015, the Strokes announced another date; at Monterrey, Mexico, during the festivities of the newborn festival Live Out.

Future Present Past EP (2016–2017)

The Strokes played their first show of 2016 at Samsung's Galaxy Life Fest in Austin, Texas. 
On May 24, 2016, the Strokes announced another New York show on May 31 at the Capitol Theatre. On May 26, 2016, Julian Casablancas premiered "OBLIVIUS" on the debut of his monthly radio show Culture Void on Sirius XMU. Cult Records announced the release of Future Present Past, a four-song EP by the Strokes, in addition to the exclusive signing of the band to its roster. The EP includes three original songs ("Drag Queen", "OBLIVIUS", and “Threat of Joy”), along with an additional remix of "OBLIVIUS" by drummer, Fab Moretti. The EP was released on June 3, in both digital and physical formats to coincide with the band's headlining performance at Governors Ball Music Festival in New York City. "Future Present Past" was recorded over the past year in Austin and New York with the help of producer, Gus Oberg.

The band played at the Splendour in the Grass festival in Byron Bay, New South Wales, Australia on July 22, 2016. They followed this performance with the inaugural City of Angels Benefit concert in Los Angeles to support charities such as Waste Not Want Not Now, the Center in Hollywood, and the Downtown's Women's Center on July 25, 2016.

The band performed a series of festival dates taking place throughout early 2017. Festival dates include performances in Estéreo Picnic Festival as well as Lollapalooza Brasil, Lollapalooza Chile, and Lollapalooza Argentina. The band's first live performance of the year took place headlining the Estéreo Picnic Festival. The crowd in attendance of their Argentina show was reportedly 90,000 people. After the Lollapalooza Argentina show, it was revealed that their headlining slot at the festival was, to this day, their "biggest show ever" by Fraiture on social media.

The New Abnormal (2019–present)

In October 2016, guitarist Valensi indicated that the band were "slowly but surely working on an album, we're kind of just in writing sessions". In July 2017 Albert Hammond Sr. said the Strokes are working with Rick Rubin. Albert Hammond Jr. took to Twitter to clarify that "we met and played a few music ideas for Rick to feel out a vibe but even a theoretical album plan would be years away, if at all". He also tweeted, "Sorry everyone we are not in the studio recording" and that there were "a lot of unknowns and nothing worth speaking about at this time."

In May 2019, the band performed for the first time in over two years at a benefit show in Los Angeles. At this venue, the band debuted a new song entitled "The Adults Are Talking". The show kicked off the band's "global comeback" tour. However, this tour was met with many obstacles early on, from sound issues to rained-out shows to entire festivals being cancelled. In September 2019, Valensi, in an interview on C104.3 Out of the Box, hinted at the production of a sixth studio album, stating "When, I don't know. If – I would say, it's a strong likelihood." During the band's 2019 New Year's Eve show in Brooklyn, Casablancas announced that the band's sixth studio album would be released sometime in 2020. At the show, they also debuted a new song, titled "Ode to the Mets".

On February 10, 2020, the band performed at a rally for presidential candidate Bernie Sanders at the University of New Hampshire. At this performance, Casablancas formally announced the band's sixth studio album and that the title would be The New Abnormal. He confirmed the release date of the album to be April 10 of that year. The band reportedly played two new songs at this show. On February 11, the band released a new song, "At the Door", the first single off of their sixth studio album. Two more singles followed, "Bad Decisions", and "Brooklyn Bridge to Chorus". Their sixth studio album, The New Abnormal, was released worldwide on April 10, 2020. On October 24, the band was confirmed for their fourth appearance as the musical guest for the October 31 episode of Saturday Night Live with John Mulaney hosting, where they performed "The Adults are Talking" and "Bad Decisions" from The New Abnormal.

On June 21, 2021, the band shared a video in support of New York City mayoral candidate Maya Wiley featuring a clip of a new song "Starting Again" co-written with Gregg Alexander. Throughout 2022, the band were as present as ever in touring, including headlining at Lollapalooza dates in Brazil, Chile, and Argentina, as well as other high profile music festivals in Europe. On June 17, 2022, the band performed a benefit concert in support of Chicago-based congressional candidate Kina Collins. That summer, they toured as an opening act on the Red Hot Chili Peppers 2022 Global Stadium Tour.

In October 2022, Rubin revealed he'd been recording a new album with the Strokes in Costa Rica.

Musical style 
The band's sound has been described as indie rock, garage rock revival, and post-punk revival by media outlets. Casablancas has cited Lou Reed of The Velvet Underground as a major influence on his lyrics and singing style. "The way Lou Reed wrote and sang about drugs and sex, about the people around him – it was so matter-of-fact," Casablancas stated in a Rolling Stone interview. "Reed could be romantic in the way he portrayed these crazy situations, but he was also intensely real. It was poetry and journalism." Additionally, he has stated that Bob Marley, Nirvana and Pearl Jam are major influences on his work, the latter being the reason that he started making music after hearing the song "Yellow Ledbetter".

Legacy and influence 
The Strokes' debut album Is This It was named number one album of the year by NME and number two by Rolling Stone, Is This It earned The Strokes tremendous respect across various artists in the alternative music scene. The lead singer of LCD Soundsystem, James Murphy, has said, "Is This It was my record of the decade." The album won Best International Album in 2002, nominated by NME, and ASCAP College Vanguard Award. Brandon Flowers of the Killers told NME that he felt "depressed" after hearing the Strokes' album Is This It. "That record just sounded so perfect", he said. "We threw away everything [we were working on] and the only song that made the cut and remained was "Mr. Brightside"'.

The Strokes have been said to be, "as influential to their era as the Velvet Underground or the Ramones were to theirs", by Lizzy Goodman in her book on the New York City music scene, claiming that, "almost every artist I interviewed for this book – from all over the world – said it was the Strokes that opened the door for them." The band was named Band of the Year in 2002 by Spin and have heavily influenced bands like The Killers, Arctic Monkeys, and Franz Ferdinand. Alex Turner, lead singer of Arctic Monkeys, sang "I just wanted to be one of The Strokes" in their 2018 song 'Star Treatment'.

Band members
 Julian Casablancas – lead vocals (1998–present)
 Nick Valensi – lead and rhythm guitar (1998–present); keyboards (2005–present); backing vocals (1998–2000, 2010–present)
 Albert Hammond Jr. – rhythm and lead guitar (1998–present); keyboards (2010–present); backing vocals (1998–2000, 2010–present)
 Nikolai Fraiture – bass guitar (1998–present)
 Fabrizio Moretti – drums, percussion (1998–present); keyboards (2019–present)

Discography

 Is This It (2001)
 Room on Fire (2003)
 First Impressions of Earth (2005)
 Angles (2011)
 Comedown Machine (2013)
 The New Abnormal (2020)

Awards and nominations

References

External links

 

 
1998 establishments in New York City
Grammy Award winners
Indie rock musical groups from New York (state)
Musical groups from New York City
Post-punk revival music groups
Musical groups established in 1998
RCA Records artists
Rough Trade Records artists
Brit Award winners
NME Awards winners
Musical quintets
Cult Records artists